Estadio Anna Mercedes Campos is a multi-use stadium in Sonsonate, El Salvador. It is currently used mostly for football matches and is the home stadium of Sonsonate. The stadium holds 10,000 spectators.

It is named after Ana Mercedes Campos “La Morocha”, a javelin gold medallist in the 1954 Central American and Caribbean Games held in Mexico.

References

External links
Stadium information

Anna Mercedes Campos
C.D. Sonsonate